Chatham Road South and Chatham Road North are two continuous roads spanning from Tsim Sha Tsui to Hung Hom in Kowloon, Hong Kong. The road originally ran from Signal Hill to Hung Hom under No. 12 Hill by the side of Hung Hom Bay. It was later extended through Lo Lung Hang to the southern end of To Kwa Wan, which makes up Chatham Road North.

Name
The first section of the road (running from Salisbury Road to Granville Road) was completed in 1888, and was named Des Voeux Road after Sir George William Des Vœux, the 10th Governor of Hong Kong. The road was renamed "Chatham Road" in 1890 after William Chatham, Director of Public Works of Hong Kong Government; the name Des Voeux Road was later transferred to a series of Des Voeux Road newly completed along the north shore of Hong Kong Island.

Chatham Road South

Chatham Road South runs from the intersection with Salisbury Road in Tsim Sha Tsui to the interchange with Hong Chong Road and Chatham Road North in Hung Hom. Conventionally locals take Chatham Road South as the dividing line between Tsim Sha Tsui and Tsim Sha Tsui East. Hong Kong Polytechnic University, Hong Kong Museum of History, Hong Kong Science Museum, Gun Club Hill Barracks and Rosary Church are located near the road.

Chatham Road North

Chatham Road North runs from the interchange with Hong Chong Road and Chatham Road South in Lo Lung Hang to the junction with Ma Tau Wai Road near To Kwa Wan. It feeds into the East Kowloon Corridor at its northern end, forming a section of Hong Kong's Route 5.

See also
List of streets and roads in Hong Kong

References
Leung, To (1992). Origins of Kowloon Street Names. Urban Council.

External links

Roads in Kowloon
Route 5 (Hong Kong)
Tsim Sha Tsui East
Hung Hom
To Kwa Wan